The Dell G Series is the successor to the Dell Inspiron Gaming Series (Pandora). It was launched in April 2018. This series is positioned below Alienware and competes with Lenovo's Legion, Acer's Nitro and Predator Helios, HP's Omen and Pavilion Power laptops. During CES 2019, Dell updated the G5 and G7. The G7 is now available in both 15" and 17" screen. Other upgrades includes a 144Hz refresh rate for the display with G-SYNC support and the inclusion of RGB keyboard. A G5 SE (special edition) was also announced during the trade show and differs from the regular G5 by being finished in alpine white and having a portion of the bottom panel transparent. Dell released its G-15 series in 2021. The G-15 laptops are the most high performing variants in the G-series with some units having specifications comparable to Alienware models.

Specifications 
Like with many Windows computers, many different configurations exists globally.

The Dell G5 (5587) and G7 (7588) shared the same chassis with the Dell Inspiron 15 7000 Gaming (7567) and Dell Inspiron 15 7000 Gaming (7577).

* Secondary Storage Unit may not be included.

**Some G5 and G7 model variations are equipped with 4K/UHD displays, or with displays with G-Sync feature supporting 144Hz refresh rate.

***Some G7 model variations are equipped with a 90 WHr, 6-cell battery but lack an HDD.

Reception 
Reception for the Dell G3 has been mixed. Digital Trends gave the Dell G3 a rating 3.5 out of 5 stars with a rating of 7.0. TechRader gave the Dell G3 a rating of 4 out of 5 stars. Laptop Mag gave the Dell G3 3 out of 5 stars. YouTuber Dave Lee gave the G3 a negative review due to its poor thermal performance; while it didn't thermal throttle, it did produce high temperatures under load.

Reception for the Dell G7 has been generally positive. Laptop Mag gave the Dell G7 3.5 out of 5 stars while PCworld gave the Dell G7 4 out of 5 stars. Wired gave the Dell G7 a rating of 7 out of 10. Dave Lee gave the Dell G7 a positive review.

Lawsuits 
In October 2020, a law firm advocating for consumer rights claimed to be investigating Dell based on multiple reports of overheating in the G3 and G5 Series laptops. Issues such as screen stuttering and battery failure were prominent. As a resort, users would attempt to alleviate the heat using a variety of makeshift methods, but this would significantly decrease performance of the hardware as a gaming device. The law firm filed a suit on the basis of deceptive trade practice, but this has yet to appear in court.

References 

Consumer electronics brands
Dell laptops